TSS Vienna was a passenger vessel built for the Great Eastern Railway in 1894.

History

The ship was built by Earle's Shipbuilding, Hull for the Great Eastern Railway and launched on 18 July 1894. She was launched by Lady Seager Hunt, wife of Sir Frederick Seager Hunt, 1st Baronet, Chairman of Earle's Shipbuilding company.

Initially placed on the Harwich to Hook of Holland route under a foreign flag, she was awarded the Royal Mail contract in 1898 and was then registered under a British flag.

She was transferred to the Antwerp service in 1910.

In 1920 she was renamed Roulers when she transferred to the Harwich to Zeebrugge service. In 1923 she fell under the ownership of the London and North Eastern Railway. 

She was scrapped in 1930.

See also 
Similar Ships

 SS Berlin (1894)
 SS Amsterdam (1894)

References

1894 ships
Steamships of the United Kingdom
Ships built on the Humber
Ships of the Great Eastern Railway
Ships of the London and North Eastern Railway